Go for Gin (April 18, 1991 – March 8, 2022) was an American thoroughbred racehorse best known as the winner of the 1994 Kentucky Derby. He was sired by Cormorant out of the dam Never Knock. He was ridden in the Derby by Chris McCarron, who had previously won the race on Alysheba.

Foaled in Kentucky in 1991, Go for Gin was bred by Pamela duPont Darmstadt and trained by Nick Zito, who also trained 1991 Kentucky Derby winner Strike the Gold.

In 1995, Go for Gin suffered a small tear of a tendon sheath in his left foreleg while working out at Belmont Park. This precipitated his retirement to stud.

After the death of Sea Hero in July 2019, Go for Gin became the oldest living Kentucky Derby winner.  Upon the death of A.P. Indy on February 21, 2020, Go For Gin became the oldest living winner of any of the Triple Crown of Thoroughbred Racing races.

Racing history
Go for Gin started 19 races, winning five and running in the money 14 times. Though he challenged for the Triple Crown of Thoroughbred Racing, he never won again, losing his last nine races.

1994 Kentucky Derby
The 120th Kentucky Derby was held on May 7, 1994, over a sloppy track. The race went off at 5:34 p.m. local time. Go for Gin entered the race at 9.10:1 odds, behind Holy Bull at 2.20, Brocco at 4.30, Tabasco Cat at 6.10, and Strodes Creek at 7.90. He started by ducking out, forcing Tabasco Cat into Brocco. By the 1/4 mile pole, Go for Gin moved up to second place behind Ulises. At the 1/2 mile pole, he led by half a length. As he entered the stretch, he increased the lead to four lengths. Strodes Creek and Blumin Affair both made late charges, closing the gap, but Go for Gin won by two lengths in a time of 2:03.72 and netted US$628,800 for the victory. Tabasco Cat finished sixth in this race but won that year's other two legs of the Triple Crown. Go for Gin placed second in both of those races.

Race record at age 2 
 Won Remsen Stakes
 Won Maiden
 Won Chief's Crown Stakes

Race record at age 3 
 Won Preview Stakes
 Won Kentucky Derby
 2nd at Preakness Stakes
 2nd at Belmont Stakes
 2nd at Fountain of Youth Stakes
 2nd at Wood Memorial Stakes
 3rd at Forego Stakes

Race record at age 4 
 3rd at Churchill Downs Handicap

Statistics

History at stud
Go for Gin was retired to stud in 1995 at Claiborne Farm in Kentucky. In 2004, he was sold to Bonita Farm in Darlington, Maryland. His stud feed as of 2007 was US$4000. He was the sire of Albert the Great, who retired with lifetime winnings in excess of US$3 million and has sired Nobiz Like Shobiz. His runners have earned an average US$71,742 per starter. He has sired seven stakes winners. In total, Go for Gin offspring have netted more than US$22 million in career winnings.

Post-retirement 
On August 11, 2011, Go for Gin moved to the Kentucky Horse Park, an equine-themed park and industry showplace in Lexington, Kentucky. Along with Thoroughbred champions Funny Cide, Da Hoss, and Point Given, he greeted visitors to the Hall of Champions Go for Gin was the oldest living Kentucky Derby winner. He died from heart failure on March 8, 2022, at the age of 30.

Pedigree

References

External links
 Listing at Bonita Farms
 Go for Gin's Derby, including video of race. 
 Pedigree at Pedigree Online
 Post-Retirement at KyHorsePark

1991 racehorse births
2022 racehorse deaths
Kentucky Derby winners
Racehorses bred in Kentucky
Racehorses trained in the United States
Thoroughbred family 1-x